Technicolor Health is the first and only full-length album from indie band Harlem Shakes.

Track listing

"Nothing But Change Part II"
"Strictly Game"
"TFO"
"Niagara Falls"
"Sunlight"
"Unhurried Hearts (Passaic Pastoral)"
"Winter Water"
"Natural Man"
"Radio Orlando"
"Technicolor Health"

References

2009 debut albums
Gigantic Music albums
Harlem Shakes albums